William Carries On is the twenty-fourth book in the Just William series by Richmal Crompton. It was first published in 1942.

The Stories
Too Many Cooks
William And The Bomb 
The Parfits (formerly the Clives) are returning to the village because of the war and are going to celebrate Joan's birthday in the village. However, an unexploded bomb postpones the party.
William's Midsummer Eve
Joan To The Rescue
Reluctant Heroes
Guy Fawkes - With Variations
William Works For Peace
William Spends A Busy Morning
A Present For A Little Girl
Hubert's Party

See also

1942 short story collections
Just William
Short story collections by Richmal Crompton
Children's short story collections
1942 children's books
George Newnes Ltd books